Ambloma is a genus of moths in the family Autostichidae.

Species
 Ambloma brachyptera Walsingham, [1908]
 Ambloma klimeschi Gozmány, 1975

References

Symmocinae
Moth genera